Gilvocarcin V is an antitumor agent and an antibiotic which is active against Gram-positive bacteria with the molecular formula C27H26O9.Gilvocarcin V is produced by the bacterium Streptomyces griseoflavus and other Streptomyces bacteria. Gilvocarcin V is a strong inhibitor of the DNA synthesis.

References

Further reading 

 
 
 
 

DNA replication inhibitors
Antibiotics
Heterocyclic compounds with 4 rings
Lactones
Tetrahydrofurans
Methoxy compounds
Naphthols